The solitary duckbill eel (Nettastoma solitarium) is an eel in the family Nettastomatidae (duckbill/witch eels). It was described by Peter H. J. Castle and David G. Smith in 1981. It is a marine, deep-water-dwelling eel which is known from the Indo-Western Pacific, including Kyushu–Palau Ridge, the Philippines, Australia, and the Hawaiian Islands.

The species epithet "solitarium", meaning "solitary" in Latin, refers to the species' wide and isolated distribution in the Pacific.

References

External links 
 Nettastoma solitarium @ fishesofaustralia.net.au

solitary duckbill eel
Fish of East Asia
Fish of Southeast Asia
Fish of the Indian Ocean
Marine fish of Australia
solitary duckbill eel